A broad-tailed parrot is any of about 35–40 species belonging to the tribe Platycercini. The members of the tribe are small to medium in size, and all are native to Australasia, Australia in particular, but also New Zealand, New Caledonia, and nearby islands.

Species
 Genus Prosopeia
 Crimson shining parrot, Prosopeia splendens
 Masked shining parrot, Prosopeia personata
 Maroon shining parrot, Prosopeia tabuensis
 Genus Eunymphicus
 Horned parakeet, Eunymphicus cornutus
 Ouvea parakeet, Eunymphicus uvaeensis
 Genus Cyanoramphus
 Black-fronted parakeet, Cyanoramphus zealandicus†
 Society parakeet, Cyanoramphus ulietanus†
 Lord Howe parakeet, Cyanoramphus subflavescens†
 Antipodes parakeet, Cyanoramphus unicolor
 Red-crowned parakeet, Cyanoramphus novaezelandiae
 Macquarie parakeet, Cyanoramphus erythrotis†
 Reischek's parakeet, Cyanoramphus hochstetteri
 Yellow-crowned parakeet, Cyanoramphus auriceps
 Chatham parakeet, Cyanoramphus forbesi
 Malherbe's parakeet, Cyanoramphus malherbi
 New Caledonian parakeet Cyanoramphus saisseti
 Norfolk parakeet Cyanoramphus cooki
 Genus Platycercus
 Western rosella, Platycercus icterotis
 Crimson rosella, Platycercus elegans
 Adelaide rosella, Platycercus (elegans) adelaidae
 Yellow rosella, Platycercus (elegans) flaveolus
 Green rosella, Platycercus caledonicus
 Pale-headed rosella, Platycercus adscitus
 Eastern rosella, Platycercus eximius
 Northern rosella, Platycercus venustus
 Genus Barnardius - sometimes included in Platycercus
 Australian ringneck, Barnardius zonarius
 Genus Purpureicephalus
 Red-capped parrot, Purpureicephalus spurius
 Genus Lathamus
 Swift parrot, Lathamus discolor
 Genus Northiella - often included in Psephotus
 Eastern bluebonnet, Northiella haematogaster
 Naretha bluebonnet, Northiella narethae
 Genus Psephotus
 Red-rumped parrot, Psephotus haematonotus
 Genus Psephotellus
 Mulga parrot, Psephotellus varius
 Golden-shouldered parrot, Psephotellus chrysoptergius
 Hooded parrot, Psephotellus dissimilis
 Paradise parrot, Psephotellus pulcherrimus† (extinct, late 1920s)

The budgerigar was traditionally placed in this tribe, but this inclusion is incorrect. The closest relatives of the budgerigar are the lories and lorikeets. The genera Neopsephotus, Neophema, and Pezoporus are placed in a separate, but closely related tribe, the Pezoporini based on the paper by Joseph et al. (2011)

References

External Links